High & Dry is the debut album by country music singer-songwriter Marty Brown.  It was produced by Tony Brown and released in August 1991 on MCA Records.  It featured 3 singles (the title track, "Wildest Dreams" and "Every Now & Then"), none of which charted.  The album itself peaked at number 44.

Track listing

Production
Produced By Tony Brown & Richard Bennett
Engineers: Chuck Ainlay, Bob Bullock, John Hampton, Russ Martin, Jeff Powell
Assistant Engineer: Russ Martin
Mixing: John Hampton
Mix Assistant: Jeff Powell
Mastering: Denny Purcell

Personnel
Drums: Larrie Londin, Billy Thomas
Bass: Marty Brown, Emory Gordy, Jr., Roy Huskey, Tom Robb
Piano: John Jarvis
Organ: Tony Brown
Guitars: Richard Bennett, Marty Brown, Reggie Young
Steel: Terry Crisp, Buddy Emmons, Steve Fishell
Banjo, Ukulele: Richard Bennett
Cornet: George Tidwell
Clarinet: Sam Levine
Backing Vocals: Peter Cronin, Susan Levy, Jessie Noble

Chart performance

Notes

References
Marty Brown, "High & Dry" CD Liner Notes.  (MCA, 1991)

1991 debut albums
MCA Records albums
Albums produced by Tony Brown (record producer)
Marty Brown (singer) albums
Albums produced by Richard Bennett (guitarist)